The Treaty of Constantinople was signed on April 18, 1454, between the Ottoman Empire and the Republic of Venice. It was the first treaty signed by Mehmed the Conqueror following the capture of Constantinople in 1453. It effectively ended Venetian aspirations to eliminate the Ottoman Empire or to conquer Constantinople on behalf of Christendom. The treaty gave the Republic of Venice freedom to trade in the Eastern Mediterranean.

Aftermath
The Constantinople treaty of 1454 weakened considerably any prospects for an alliance of Italian princes against the Ottoman Empire - a cause espoused by Pope Nicholas V. It also aggravated relations between the Republic of Venice and the papacy.

See also
List of treaties
Turkish–Venetian Wars

For further reading
Maria Pia Pedani, "Venetian Consuls in Egypt and Syria in the Ottoman Age" 

Constantinople 1454
Constantinople 1454
15th century in Istanbul
Constantinople
1454 in Europe
1454 in the Ottoman Empire
15th century in the Republic of Venice
Ottoman Empire–Republic of Venice relations